Wielandia is a genus of flowering plant, of the family Phyllanthaceae first described as a genus in 1858. The plants are native to Kenya, Madagascar, and to various other islands in the Indian Ocean.

Species

References

Phyllanthaceae
Phyllanthaceae genera
Taxa named by Henri Ernest Baillon